Grinding, also known as juking, freak dancing or  freaking (in the Caribbean, wining) is a type of close partner dance where two or more dancers rub or bump their bodies against each other, usually with a female dancer rubbing or bumping her buttocks against a male dancer's genital area. The male dancer will typically place his hands on the female dancer's waist, hips, or buttocks.

Grinding gained widespread popularity as a hip hop dance in night clubs, and eventually became popular at high school dances and proms in the US and Canada where it has garnered controversy. A more graphic version called daggering involves a man slamming his genital area into a woman's buttocks.

See also
 Perreo
 Twerking

References

Afro-Caribbean culture
Dances of the United States
Hip hop dance